Amanipilade (died circa 350 AD), was a queen regnant of Kush. She was the final queen regnant of the city of Meroë in between circa 308 to 320. 

Amanipilade is solely attested from a meroitic inscription on a funerary inscription of Shiye found in Meroë. Her parents names also mentioned there, her father; Tekye and mother; Makehanye.

She likely died around 350 AD. Much like other Kushite rulers her name incorporated that of the god Amun.

References

Further reading
 
 THE CHRONOLOGY OF NUBIAN KINGDOMS FROM DYN. 25 TO THE END OF THE KINGDOM OF MEROE
 Hornung, Erik. Ancient Egyptian Chronology Handbook of Oriental Studies, I, the Near and Middle East

Queens of Kush
Queens regnant in Africa
350 deaths
4th-century women rulers